John Lundgren (born 30 July 1940) is a former Danish cyclist. He competed in the team pursuit at the 1960 Summer Olympics.

References

External links
 

1940 births
Living people
Danish male cyclists
Olympic cyclists of Denmark
Cyclists at the 1960 Summer Olympics
Sportspeople from Aarhus